HŠK Dunav was a football club from Zemun (nowadays Serbia). Local Croats from Zemun and other parts of Syrmia gathered around this club.

Name 
Its name literally means  Croatian Sports Club "Danube".

History 
This squad was founded before the Second World War.

It competed in the football championship of Independent State of Croatia. After the end of Second World War, that circumstance was used to ban the work of this football club and disband it, as it was the case with other clubs that competed in the championship of Independent State of Croatia.

In the unfinished Croatian championship 1944, in the group stage, Dunav was the champion of Zemun. In the play-offs, Dunav lost to second in the group and city rival Građanski.

Sources 
 Croatia Domestic Football Full Tables

Defunct football clubs in Serbia
Croats of Serbia
Sport in Zemun